George Hay Forbes (1821–1875) was a priest of the Scottish Episcopal Church and the brother of Alexander Penrose Forbes, Bishop of Brechin.
       
Despite severe physical adversity, Forbes was responsible for church building at Burntisland near Edinburgh, where he founded the Pitsligo Press. Amongst his publications he edited works of St Gregory of Nyssa (1855, 1861). Books written by him included The Goodness of God and Doctrinal Errors of the English Prayer Book. He wrote the article "Altars" for the ninth and tenth editions of the Encyclopaedia Britannica.

 References 

Further reading
William Perry, George Hay Forbes: A Romance in Scholarship (London: SPCK, 1927).
Iain Sommerville, Burntisland's Churches, Part 7 - The Episcopalian Church and George Hay Forbes
Felicia Mary Frances Skene, A Memoir of Alexander, Bishop of Brechin with a Brief Notice of His Brother, the Rev. George Hay (London: Joseph Masters, 1876).
Robert Hay Carnie, The Pitsligo Press of George Hays Forbes: Some Additions and Corrections'' (1973)

External links 
Bibliographic directory from Project Canterbury

1821 births
1875 deaths
Scottish Episcopalian clergy
Scottish printers
British typographers and type designers
19th-century Scottish businesspeople